Count Pál Somssich de Saárd (13 January 1811 – 5 March 1888) was a Hungarian conservative nobleman and politician, who served as Speaker of the House of Representatives between 1869 and 1872.

References
 

1811 births
1888 deaths
People from Somogy County
Hungarian nobility
19th-century Hungarian politicians
Speakers of the House of Representatives of Hungary